The April 2019 Spanish general election was held on Sunday, 28 April 2019, to elect the 13th Cortes Generales of the Kingdom of Spain. All 350 seats in the Congress of Deputies were up for election, as well as 208 of 266 seats in the Senate.

Following the 2016 election, the People's Party (PP) formed a minority government with confidence and supply support from Ciudadanos (Cs) and Canarian Coalition (CC), which was enabled by the Spanish Socialist Workers' Party (PSOE) abstaining from Mariano Rajoy's investiture after a party crisis resulted in the ousting of Pedro Sánchez as leader. The PP's term of office was undermined by a constitutional crisis over the Catalan issue, the result of a regional election held thereafter, coupled with corruption scandals and protests with thousands of retirees demanding pension increases. In May 2018, the National Court found in the Gürtel case that since 1989 the PP had profited from the kickbacks-for-contracts scheme and confirmed the existence of an illegal accounting and financing structure kept separate from the party's official accounts. Sánchez, who was re-elected as PSOE leader in a leadership contest in 2017, brought down Rajoy's government in June 2018 through a motion of no confidence. Rajoy resigned as PP leader and was subsequently succeeded by Pablo Casado.

Presiding over a minority government of 84 deputies, Pedro Sánchez struggled to maintain a working majority in the Congress with the support of the parties that had backed the no-confidence motion. The 2018 Andalusian regional election which saw a sudden and strong rise of the far-right Vox party resulted in the PSOE losing the regional government for the first time in history to a PP–Cs–Vox alliance. After the 2019 General State Budget was voted down by the Congress of Deputies on 13 February 2019 as a result of Republican Left of Catalonia (ERC) and Catalan European Democratic Party (PDeCAT) siding against the government, Sánchez called a snap election to be held on 28 April, one month ahead of the Super Sunday of local, regional, and European Parliament elections scheduled for 26 May. The Valencian regional election was scheduled for 28 April in order for it to take place on the same date as the general election.

On a turnout of 71.8%, the ruling PSOE of Prime Minister Pedro Sánchez won a victory—the first for the party in a nationwide election in eleven years—with 28.7% of the vote and 123 seats, an improvement of 38 seats over its previous mark which mostly came at the expense of left-wing Unidas Podemos. In the Senate, the PSOE became the largest party in the chamber for the first time since 1995, winning its first absolute majority of seats in that chamber since the 1989 election. The PP under Casado received its worst result in history after being reduced to 66 seats and 16.7% of the vote in what was dubbed the worst electoral setback for a major Spanish party since the collapse of the UCD in 1982. Cs saw an increase of support which brought them within 0.8% of the vote and within 9 seats of the PP, passing them in several major regions. The far-right Vox party entered Congress for the first time, but it failed to fulfill expectations by scoring 10.3% of the vote and 24 seats, which was less than was indicated in opinion polls during the run-up to the election. The three-way split in the overall right-of-centre vote not only ended any chance of an Andalusian-inspired right-wing alliance, but it also ensured that Sánchez's PSOE would be the only party that could realistically form a government.

Overview

Electoral system
The Spanish Cortes Generales were envisaged as an imperfect bicameral system. The Congress of Deputies had greater legislative power than the Senate, having the ability to vote confidence in or withdraw it from a prime minister and to override Senate vetoes by an absolute majority of votes. Nonetheless, the Senate possessed a few exclusive (yet limited in number) functions—such as its role in constitutional amendment—which were not subject to the Congress' override. Voting for the Cortes Generales was on the basis of universal suffrage, which comprised all nationals over 18 years of age and in full enjoyment of their political rights. Additionally, Spaniards abroad were required to apply for voting before being permitted to vote, a system known as "begged" or expat vote.

For the Congress of Deputies, 348 seats were elected using the D'Hondt method and a closed list proportional representation, with an electoral threshold of three percent of valid votes—which included blank ballots—being applied in each constituency. Seats were allocated to constituencies, corresponding to the provinces of Spain, with each being allocated an initial minimum of two seats and the remaining 248 being distributed in proportion to their populations. Ceuta and Melilla were allocated the two remaining seats, which were elected using plurality voting. The use of the D'Hondt method might result in a higher effective threshold, depending on the district magnitude.

As a result of the aforementioned allocation, each Congress multi-member constituency was entitled the following seats:

For the Senate, 208 seats were elected using an open list partial block voting system, with electors voting for individual candidates instead of parties. In constituencies electing four seats, electors could vote for up to three candidates; in those with two or three seats, for up to two candidates; and for one candidate in single-member districts. Each of the 47 peninsular provinces was allocated four seats, whereas for insular provinces, such as the Balearic and Canary Islands, districts were the islands themselves, with the larger—Majorca, Gran Canaria and Tenerife—being allocated three seats each, and the smaller—Menorca, Ibiza–Formentera, Fuerteventura, La Gomera, El Hierro, Lanzarote and La Palma—one each. Ceuta and Melilla elected two seats each. Additionally, autonomous communities could appoint at least one senator each and were entitled to one additional senator per each million inhabitants.

Election date
The term of each chamber of the Cortes Generales—the Congress and the Senate—expired four years from the date of their previous election, unless they were dissolved earlier. The election decree was required to be issued no later than the twenty-fifth day prior to the date of expiry of the Cortes in the event that the prime minister did not make use of his prerogative of early dissolution. The decree was to be published on the following day in the Official State Gazette (BOE), with election day taking place on the fifty-fourth day from publication. The previous election was held on 26 June 2016, which meant that the legislature's term would expire on 26 June 2020. The election decree was required to be published in the BOE no later than 2 June 2020, with the election taking place on the fifty-fourth day from publication, setting the latest possible election date for the Cortes Generales on Sunday, 26 July 2020.

The prime minister had the prerogative to dissolve both chambers at any given time—either jointly or separately—and call a snap election, provided that no motion of no confidence was in process, no state of emergency was in force and that dissolution did not occur before one year had elapsed since the previous one. Additionally, both chambers were to be dissolved and a new election called if an investiture process failed to elect a prime minister within a two-month period from the first ballot. Barred this exception, there was no constitutional requirement for simultaneous elections for the Congress and the Senate. Still, as of  there has been no precedent of separate elections taking place under the 1978 Constitution.

After the 2019 General State Budget was voted down by the Congress of Deputies on 13 February 2019, it was confirmed that Sánchez would call a snap election, with the specific date to be announced following a Council of Ministers meeting on 15 February. Sánchez confirmed 28 April as the election date in an institutional statement following the Council of Ministers, with the Cortes Generales being subsequently dissolved on 5 March.

Background
The June 2016 general election had resulted in the People's Party (PP) gaining votes and seats relative to its result in the December 2015 election and a round of coalition talks throughout the summer saw Mariano Rajoy obtaining the support of Ciudadanos (C's) and Canarian Coalition (CC) for his investiture, but this was still not enough to assure him re-election. Criticism of Spanish Socialist Workers' Party (PSOE) leader Pedro Sánchez for his electoral results and his stance opposing Rajoy's investiture, said to be a contributing factor to the country's political deadlock, reached boiling point after poor PSOE showings in the Basque and Galician elections. A party crisis ensued, seeing Sánchez being ousted and a caretaker committee being appointed by party rebels led by Susana Díaz, who subsequently set out to abstain in Rajoy's investiture and allow a PP minority government to be formed, preventing a third election in a row from taking place. Díaz's bid to become new party leader was defeated by party members in a party primary in May 2017, with Sánchez being voted again into office under a campaign aimed at criticising the PSOE's abstention in Rajoy's investiture.

Concurrently, the incumbent PP cabinet found itself embroiled in a string of political scandals which had seen the political demise of former Madrid premier Esperanza Aguirre—amid claims of a massive financial corruption plot staged by former protegés—as well as accusations of judicial meddling and political cover-up. This prompted left-wing Unidos Podemos to table a no-confidence motion on Mariano Rajoy in June 2017. While the motion was voted down due to a lack of support from other opposition parties, it revealed the parliamentary weakness of Rajoy's government as abstentions and favourable votes combined amounted to 179, to just 170 MPs rejecting it.

Pressure on the Spanish government increased after a major constitutional crisis over the issue of an independence referendum unravelled in Catalonia. Initial actions from the Parliament of Catalonia to approve two bills supporting a referendum and a legal framework for an independent Catalan state were suspended by the Constitutional Court of Spain. The government's crackdown on referendum preparations—which included police searches, raids and arrests of Catalan government officials as well as an intervention into Catalan finances—sparked public outcry and protests accusing the PP government of "anti-democratic and totalitarian" repression. The Catalan parliament voted to unilaterally declare independence from Spain, which resulted in the Spanish Senate enforcing Article 155 of the Constitution to remove the regional authorities and impose direct rule. Carles Puigdemont and part of his cabinet fled to Belgium after being ousted, facing charges of sedition, rebellion and embezzlement. Rajoy immediately dissolved the Catalan parliament and called a regional election for 21 December 2017, but it left his PP severely mauled as Cs capitalised on anti-independence support in the region.

The scale of PP's collapse in Catalonia and the success of Cs had an impact on national politics, with Ciudadanos rising to first place nationally in subsequent opinion polls, endangering PP's stand as the hegemonic party within the Spanish centre-right spectrum. Massive protests by pensioners groups, long regarded as a key component of the PP's electoral base, demanding pension increases, further undermining the PP's standing.

On 24 May 2018, the National Court found that the PP profited from the illegal kickbacks-for-contracts scheme of the Gürtel case, confirming the existence of an illegal accounting and financing structure that had run in parallel with the party's official one since 1989 and ruling that the PP helped establish "a genuine and effective system of institutional corruption through the manipulation of central, autonomous and local public procurement". This event prompted the PSOE to submit a motion of no confidence in Rajoy and in Cs withdrawing its support from the government and demanding the immediate calling of an early election. An absolute majority of 180 MPs in the Congress of Deputies voted to oust Mariano Rajoy from power on 1 June 2018, replaced him as prime minister with PSOE's Pedro Sánchez. On 5 June, Rajoy announced his farewell from politics and his return to his position as property registrar in Santa Pola, vacating his seat in the Congress of Deputies and triggering a leadership contest in which the party's communication vice secretary-general Pablo Casado defeated former deputy prime minister Soraya Sáenz de Santamaría and became new PP president on 21 July 2018.

For most of his government, Sánchez was reliant on confidence and supply support from Unidos Podemos and New Canaries (NCa), negotiating additional support from Republican Left of Catalonia (ERC), Catalan European Democratic Party (PDeCAT) and Basque Nationalist Party (PNV) on an issue-by-issue basis. ERC, PDeCAT and En Marea withdrew their support from the government in February 2019 by voting down the 2019 General State Budget, with the government losing the vote 191–158; this prompted a snap election to be called for 28 April.

Parliamentary composition
The Cortes Generales were officially dissolved on 5 March 2019, after the publication of the dissolution decree in the Official State Gazette. The tables below show the composition of the parliamentary groups in both chambers at the time of dissolution.

Parties and candidates
The electoral law allowed for parties and federations registered in the interior ministry, coalitions and groupings of electors to present lists of candidates. Parties and federations intending to form a coalition ahead of an election were required to inform the relevant Electoral Commission within ten days of the election call, whereas groupings of electors needed to secure the signature of at least one percent of the electorate in the constituencies for which they sought election, disallowing electors from signing for more than one list of candidates. Concurrently, parties, federations or coalitions that had not obtained a mandate in either chamber of the Cortes at the preceding election were required to secure the signature of at least 0.1 percent of electors in the aforementioned constituencies. After the experience of the 2015–2016 political deadlock leading to the June 2016 election and the possibility of a third election being needed, the electoral law was amended in order to introduce a special, simplified process for election re-runs, including a shortening of deadlines, the lifting of signature requirements if these had been already met for the immediately previous election and the possibility of maintaining lists and coalitions without needing to go through pre-election procedures again.

Below is a list of the main parties and electoral alliances which contested the election:

Two opposing coalitions were formed in Navarre at different levels: for the Senate, Geroa Bai, EH Bildu, Podemos and Izquierda-Ezkerra re-created the Cambio-Aldaketa alliance under which they had already contested the 2015 Spanish general election. Concurrently, UPN, Cs and PP formed the Navarra Suma alliance for both Congress and Senate elections. In Galicia, En Marea, the former Podemos–EU–Anova alliance which had been constituted as a party in 2016, broke away from the creator parties and announced that it would contest the election on its own. Podemos, EU and Equo in Galicia formed a regional branch for the Unidas Podemos alliance branded En Común–Unidas Podemos whereas Anova chose to step out from the election race. In the Balearic Islands, an alliance was formed for the Congress election by More for Majorca (Més), More for Menorca (MpM), Now Eivissa (Ara Eivissa) and Republican Left of Catalonia (ERC), named Veus Progressistes; for the Senate election, the alliance was styled as Unidas Podemos Veus Progressistes and included Podemos and IU.

Timetable
The key dates are listed below (all times are CET. Note that the Canary Islands use WET (UTC+0) instead):

4 March: The election decree is issued with the countersign of the Prime Minister after deliberation in the Council of Ministers, ratified by the King.
5 March: Formal dissolution of the Cortes Generales and beginning of a suspension period of events for the inauguration of public works, services or projects.
8 March: Initial constitution of provincial and zone electoral commissions.
15 March: Deadline for parties and federations intending to enter into a coalition to inform the relevant electoral commission.
25 March: Deadline for parties, federations, coalitions, and groupings of electors to present lists of candidates to the relevant electoral commission.
27 March: Submitted lists of candidates are provisionally published in the Official State Gazette (BOE).
30 March: Deadline for citizens entered in the Register of Absent Electors Residing Abroad (CERA) and for citizens temporarily absent from Spain to apply for voting .
31 March: Deadline for parties, federations, coalitions, and groupings of electors to rectify irregularities in their lists.
1 April: Official proclamation of valid submitted lists of candidates.
2 April: Proclaimed lists are published in the BOE.
12 April: Official start of electoral campaigning.
18 April: Deadline to apply for postal voting.
23 April: Official start of legal ban on electoral opinion polling publication, dissemination or reproduction and deadline for CERA citizens to vote by mail.
24 April: Deadline for postal and temporarily absent voters to issue their votes .
26 April: Last day of official electoral campaigning and deadline for CERA citizens to vote in a ballot box in the relevant consular office or division .
27 April: Official 24-hour ban on political campaigning prior to the general election (reflection day).
28 April: Polling day (polling stations open at 9 am and close at 8 pm or once voters present in a queue at/outside the polling station at 8 pm have cast their vote). Provisional counting of votes starts immediately.
1 May: General counting of votes, including the counting of CERA votes.
4 May: Deadline for the general counting of votes to be carried out by the relevant electoral commission.
13 May: Deadline for elected members to be proclaimed by the relevant electoral commission.
23 May: Deadline for both chambers of the Cortes Generales to be re-assembled (the election decree determines this date, which for the April 2019 election was set for 21 May).
22 June: Final deadline for definitive results to be published in the BOE.

Campaign

Party slogans

Election debates

Opinion polls

Opinion polls

Voter turnout
The table below shows registered vote turnout on election day without including voters from the Census of Absent-Residents (CERA).

Results

Congress of Deputies

Senate

Aftermath

Outcome
The election resulted in a victory for Pedro Sánchez's Spanish Socialist Workers' Party (PSOE)—its first since the 2008 general election—which swept the country and won in most constituencies and regions. The right-wing bloc of PP–Cs–Vox was only able to garner 42.9% of the vote and 147 Congress seats (149 including the Navarra Suma alliance in Navarre) to the 165 seats and 43.0% vote share garnered by the two major left-wing parties, PSOE and Unidas Podemos. Even though the left-wing bloc was still 11 seats short of a majority, the three-way split on the centre-right ensured Sánchez's PSOE would be the only party that could realistically garner enough support from third parties to command a majority in the lower house. The PSOE also obtained an absolute majority of seats in the Senate for the first time since 1989 as the PP vote collapsed. Having initially been allocated 121 senators, it was awarded two additional senators from PP after the counting of CERA votes, the Census of Absent-Residents, namely one for Zamora and one for Segovia.

Support for the People's Party (PP) plummeted and scored the worst result of its history as well as the worst support for any of the party's incarnations since the People's Alliance results in the 1977 and 1979 elections. The PP was only able to remain the most voted party in five constituencies: Ávila, Lugo, Melilla, Ourense and Salamanca; and it was not able to remain the largest party in any region, including Galicia, where it lost to the PSOE for the first time ever in any kind of election. Overall, the party lost 3.6 million votes from 2016, with post-election analysis determining that 1.4 million had been lost to Albert Rivera's Citizens party, 1.6 million to far-right Vox, 400,000 to abstentions and a further 300,000 to PSOE.

Scoring below previous expectations throughout the campaign, Vox's result signalled the first time since Blas Piñar's election as a deputy for the National Union coalition in 1979 that a far-right party had won seats in the Spanish Parliament after the country's return to democracy as well as the first time that a far-right party would be able to form a parliamentary group of its own in the Congress of Deputies.

After losing more than a half of their seats, the PP sacked Javier Maroto as their campaign manager. Maroto had also failed to hold his seat from Álava in the election, losing it to EH Bildu and signalling the first time since 1979 that the party had not won a seat in the province. Pablo Casado, the PP leader whose right-wing stance and controversial leadership had been labelled by commentators as a "suicide" in light of election results, refused to resign and instead proposed a sudden U-turn of the party back into the centre under pressure from party regional leaders one month ahead of the regional and local elections while also raising a hostile profile to both Cs and Vox, attacking them for dividing the vote to the right-of-centre.

Government formation

Notes

References

April General
General election
General elections in Spain